Pi Sigma Epsilon is a professional fraternity for students and industry professionals in Marketing and Sales Management. It was founded in 1952 at Georgia State University.

History 
Pi Sigma Epsilon was founded at Georgia State University (then Atlanta Division of the University of Georgia) in the fall of 1951. The idea of a professional fraternity for the fields of Marketing, Sales Management, and Selling was proposed by educator and businessman Lloyd Antle and advanced by Henry G. Baker and William G. Harris from the College and Lewis F. Gordon, a founder of the Atlanta Sales Executives Club.

Alpha chapter was established at the college on June 2, 1952.

Purpose
As originally set out:

To create a collegiate brotherhood of men who are interested in the advancement of marketing, sales management, and selling as a career and a profession; to promote the study of marketing, sales management, selling and related subjects in colleges and universities; to bring together academically qualified students who express a desire to enter these career fields; to encourage in colleges and universities the establishing of courses preparing men for such careers; to stimulate research and improved methods and techniques in these fields; to install in its members the highest possible ethical standards of the profession.

Chapters 
Chapters include the following. * indicates the chapter is active (as of 2009).

See also 

 Professional fraternities and sororities

References 

Student organizations established in 1952
Professional fraternities and sororities in the United States
Professional Fraternity Association
1952 establishments in Georgia (U.S. state)
Sales professional associations